Adukku Malli is a 1979 Indian Tamil-language film directed by K. S. Gopalakrishnan. The film stars Vijayakumar, Sujatha and Thengai Srinivasan. It was released on 20 October 1979, and became a success.

Plot 
The story is about how the deep friendship between Vijayakumar, a Hindu, and Thengai Srinivasan, a Muslim goes beyond all conventional obstacles and how the friendly relationship between Srinivasan and Sujatha, Vijayakumar's wife and later widow, is tested by society.

Cast 
 Vijayakumar
 Sujatha
 Thengai Srinivasan
 Y. G. Mahendran

Production 
Adukku Malli was directed by K. S. Gopalakrishnan, who also wrote the screenplay. The film was produced by Naseem Begum and S. Alamelu of Meena Art Pictures. Cinematography was handled by Dutt, and editing by R. Devarajan.It is one of the rare films in which comedians like Thengai Srinivasan, Y.G. Mahendran played serious dramatic roles and were well-received

Soundtrack 
The soundtrack was composed by Shankar–Ganesh.

Release and reception 
Adukku Malli was released on 20 October 1979 and became a success.

References

External links 
 

1970s Tamil-language films
Films directed by K. S. Gopalakrishnan
Films scored by Shankar–Ganesh
Films with screenplays by K. S. Gopalakrishnan